Brian & Barry is an Italian department store chain, which operates the flagship store and corporate headquarters near Piazza San Babila, central Milan.
Brands sold include a number of high-end labels as well as Brian & Barry private label merchandise.

History
In 1924, Pietro Zaccardi and his wife Maria opened a boutique in Monza. Ermanno Zaccardi, the Piero's son, became a manager and in 70s created the Happening group. In 1985, the family opened the first Brian & Barry store. In 2003, Carlo, Claudio and Roberto Zaccardi, the Ermanno's sons, have bought the Boggi brand for €13.2 million. 
In 2010s the group has bought a 12-storey historical palace in central Milan, designed by Italian architect Giovanni Muzio, with an investment of €70 million. In March 2014, the flagship store Brian & Barry Building – San Babila was opened.

Flagship and regional stores
Alba
 Brian & Barry Alba, 15 Via Vittorio Emanuele
Milan 
 The Brian & Barry Building – San Babila, 28 Via Durini (70,000 square feet – opened 2014) – which include an Eataly corner
 Brian & Barry Milano Vercelli, 23 Corso Vercelli
Monza
 Brian & Barry Monza Donna, 36 Via Italia
 Brian & Barry Monza Uomo, 38 Via Italia
Seregno
 Brian & Barry Seregno, 74 Corso del Popolo
Varese
 Brian & Barry Varese, 4 Piazza Montegrappa

The group said that plans to opens new stores in Asia, as well as New York City or London.

See also
 Golden Quadrangle Fashion District
 La Rinascente
 Coin

References

External links

 The Brian & Barry Building – San Babila
 Eataly Brian & Barry

Retail companies of Italy
Clothing companies of Italy
Companies based in Milan